This was the first edition of the tournament.

Constant Lestienne won the title after defeating Emilio Gómez 6–3, 5–7, 6–2 in the final.

Seeds

Draw

Finals

Top half

Bottom half

References

External links
Main draw
Qualifying draw

Málaga Open - 1